The discography of American recording artist Nate Dogg consists of three studio albums, one compilation album, one collaboration album, and 40 singles (including 35 singles as a featured artist).

Albums

Studio albums

Collaborative albums

Compilation albums
Essentials (2002)

Singles

As lead artist

As featured artist

Promotional singles

Other guest appearances 
Nate Dogg has also appeared on several tracks released by the following artists:
 213 - "Falling In Love Again" 
 213 - "She Wasn't Feelin Me"
 2Pac - "All About U" (featuring Nate Dogg, Fatal-n-Felony, Dru Down, Snoop Doggy Dogg) (1996)
 2Pac - "Skandalouz" (featuring Nate Dogg) (1996)
 2Pac - "Changed Man" (featuring Big Syke, Nate Dogg) (1996) (Unreleased)
 2Pac - "Changed Man (Johnny J Remix)" (featuring Nate Dogg, Big Syke) (Unreleased)
 2Pac - "All About U (Remix)" (featuring Nate Dogg, Fatal-n-Felony, Dru Down, Top Dogg) (1998)
 2Pac - "Teardrops And Closed Caskets (Original) (featuring Nate Dogg, Outlawz) (1999)
 2Pac - "Hold Up" (featuring Nate Dogg) (2003)
 2Pac - "Thugs Get Lonely Too" (featuring Nate Dogg) (2004)
 5 Footaz - "Dip" (featuring Nate Dogg) (2001)
 50 Cent - "21 Questions" (featuring Nate Dogg) (2003)
 Anderson .Paak - "What Can We Do?" (featuring Nate Dogg) (2019)
 Baby Bash - "That's My Lady" (Money) (featuring Nate Dogg) (2005)
 Bad Azz - "Don't Hate" (featuring Nate Dogg, Tray Deee, R.G.) (2001)
 Big Syke - "Come Over" (featuring Nate Dogg) (2002)
 Big King - "Keep Doin What They Hate" (featuring Nate Dogg)
 Bishop Brigante - "It's Fo' Twenty" (featuring Nate Dogg)
 Bishop Lamont - "I'm Faded" (featuring Nate Dogg SonReal)
 Black Rob - "The Game" (featuring Nate Dogg)
 Brian McKnight - "Don't Know Where to Start" (featuring Nate Dogg)
 C-Murder - "Ghetto Millionaire" (featuring Snoop Dogg, Kurupt, Nate Dogg)
 Charlie Wilson - "Big Pimpin" (featuring Snoop Dogg, Nate Dogg)
 Cee-Lo - "Enjoy Yourself" (featuring Nate Dogg)
 Chico & Coolwadda - "High Come Down" (featuring Nate Dogg)
 Chingy - "All the Way to St. Lou'" (featuring Nate Dogg, David Banner)
 Crooked I - "Crook in Me" (featuring Nate Dogg)
 Damizza - "Can't Knock The Hustle" (featuring Nate Dogg)
 Daz Dillinger - "Boyz n the Hood" (featuring Nate Dogg)
 Daz Dillinger - "Come Close" (featuring Nate Dogg)
 Daz Dillinger - "O.G." (featuring Snoop Dogg, Nate Dogg)
 Deuce Poppi - "O Wee O" (featuring Nate Dogg)
 DFC - "Things in tha Hood" (featuring Nate Dogg)
 DFC - "Things in tha Hood (remix)" (featuring Nate Dogg)
 DJ Quik - "Black Mercedes" (featuring Nate Dogg)
 DJ Quik - "Medley For a 'V'" (featuring Snoop Dogg, Nate Dogg, Hi-C, AMG, 2nd II None)
 DJ Quik - "What They Think" (featuring Nate Dogg)
 The D.O.C. - "Concrete Jungle" (featuring Nate Dogg, Six-Two, Jazze Pha, Up Tight)
 Doggy's Angels - "Curious" (featuring Nate Dogg, Snoop Dogg)
 Dove Shack - "The Dove Shack is Back" (featuring Nate Dogg)
 Dr. Dre - "Deeez Nuuuts" (featuring Snoop Dogg, Daz Dillinger, Nate Dogg, Warren G)
 Dr. Dre - "The Next Episode" (featuring Snoop Dogg, Kurupt, Nate Dogg)
 Dr. Dre - "Xxplosive" (featuring Hittman, Kurupt, Nate Dogg, Six-Two)
 Dresta - "Victims of Reality" (featuring Nate Dogg)
 D-Shot - "Money, Sex & Thugs" (featuring E-40, Nate Dogg, Butch Cassidy)
 Down A.K.A. Kilo - "I'm Coming Home To You" (featuring Nate Dogg) (2007) 
 E-40 - "Nah, Nah" (featuring Nate Dogg)
 E-40 - "Sinister Mob" (featuring Nate Dogg)
 Eminem - "Bitch Please II" (featuring Dr. Dre, Snoop Dogg, Xzibit, Nate Dogg)
 Eminem - "'Till I Collapse" (featuring Nate Dogg)
 Eminem - "Never Enough" (featuring Nate Dogg, 50 Cent)
 Eminem - "Shake That" (featuring Nate Dogg)
 Eminem - "Shake That (Remix)" (featuring Nate Dogg, Obie Trice, Bobby Creekwater  Lil Skeeter)
 Eve - "Hey Y'all" (featuring Snoop Dogg, Nate Dogg)
 Fabolous - "Can't Deny It" (featuring Nate Dogg)
 Fabolous - "Popo" (featuring Nate Dogg, Paul Cain)
 Fat Tone - "Money Rules" (featuring E-40, Nate Dogg, Butch Cassidy)
 Fat Tone - Let's Get It Crackin' (featuring Nate Dogg) 
 Fatboy Chubb - "Money In The Hood" (featuring Nate Dogg, J-Young)
 Freeway - "All My Life" (featuring Nate Dogg)
 Guce - "Game Dont Wait" (featuring Messy Marv, Nate Dogg)
 Guerilla Black - "What We Gonna Do" (featuring Nate Dogg)
 Hi-C - "I Don't Wanna Know" (featuring Nate Dogg)
 Houston - "I Like That" (featuring Nate Dogg, Chingy, I-20)
 Hush - "Hush is Coming" (featuring Nate Dogg)
 Jadakiss - "Time's Up" (featuring Nate Dogg)
 Jadakiss - "When Kiss is Spittin'" (featuring Nate Dogg)
 Jermaine Dupri - "Ballin Outta Control" (featuring Nate Dogg)
 Jermaine Dupri - "Whatever" (featuring Nate Dogg, R.O.C., Skeeter Rock, Tigah, Katrina)
 Joe Budden - "Gangsta Party" (featuring Nate Dogg)
 JS - "Good Life" (featuring Nas, Nate Dogg)
 K-Mel - "Reflexions" (featuring Nate Dogg)
 K-Mel - "Reflexions (Remix)" (featuring Nate Dogg)
 Knoc-turn'al - "Him or Me" (featuring Nate Dogg)
 Knoc-turn'al - "Str8 West Coast (Remix)" (featuring Xzibit, Warren G, Nate Dogg, Shade Sheist)
 Knoc-turn'al - "Twisted" (featuring Nate Dogg, Drastic, Armed Robbery)
 Knoc-turn'al - "What We Do" (featuring Xzibit, Nate Dogg, Warren G)
 Kokane - "You Could Be" (featuring Snoop Dogg, Tha Eastsidaz, Nate Dogg)
 Kontrafakt - "Polnočná Pičakolada" (featuring Nate Dogg)
 Kurupt - "Behind the Walls" (featuring Nate Dogg)
 Kurupt - "Girls All Pause" (featuring Nate Dogg, Roscoe)
 Kurupt - "Neva Gonna Give It Up" (featuring Nate Dogg, Warren G, Tray Deee, Snoop Dogg, Soopafly)
 Kurupt - "Lay It On Back" (featuring Fred Durst, Nate Dogg)
 Kurupt - "Space Boogie" (featuring Nate Dogg)
 Kurupt - "The Hardest Muthafuckaz" (featuring Nate Dogg, MC Ren, Xzibit)
 Lethal Interjection - "Eff Grandad" (featuring Nate Dogg)
 Lil' Flip - "Take You There" (featuring Nate Dogg)
 Lil' Jon - "Bitches Ain't Shit" (featuring Nate Dogg, Snoop Dogg, Suga Free)
 Lloyd Banks - "Til The End" (featuring Nate Dogg)
 Lloyd Banks - "Warrior Part 2" (featuring Eminem, Nate Dogg, 50 Cent)
 Ludacris - "Area Codes" (featuring Nate Dogg)
 Ludacris - "Child of the Night" (featuring Nate Dogg)
 Ludacris - Good Relationships (featuring Katt Williams, Snoop Dogg Nate Dogg)
 Mack 10 - "Like This" (featuring Nate Dogg)
 Mariah Carey - "If We" (featuring Ja Rule, Nate Dogg)
 Mariah Carey - "If We (Remix)" (featuring Shade Sheist, Ja Rule, Nate Dogg)
 Mark Ronson - "Ooh Wee" (featuring Ghostface Killah, Trife Da God Nate Dogg)
 Mark Ronson - "Ooh Wee (Remix)" (featuring Ghostface Killah, Trife Da God, Nate Dogg, Saigon, Freeway)
 Mastacraft - "One Night Stand (European Version)" (featuring Nate Dogg)
 Memphis Bleek - "You Need Dick in Your Life" (featuring Nate Dogg)
 Messy Marv - "Oh No, Pt. 2" (featuring Nate Dogg)
 Mic Little - "Golden State" (featuring Nate Dogg)
 Mista Grimm - "Indo Smoke" (featuring Nate Dogg, Warren G)
 Mister D - "Should Of Been Mine" (featuring Nate Dogg, Sleepy Malo)
 Mobb Deep - "Have a Party" (featuring Nate Dogg, 50 Cent)
 Mobb Deep - "Dump" (feat Nate Dogg)
 Mos Def - "Oh No" (featuring Nate Dogg, Pharaohe Monch)
 Mr. Capone-E - "Came to Me in a Dream" (featuring Nate Dogg)
 Mr. Capone-E - "I Like It" (featuring Nate Dogg)
 Mr. Criminal - "Mami Mira" (featuring Nate Dogg & Mr.Capone-E)
 Ms. Jade - "Dead Wrong" (featuring Nate Dogg)
 Nelly - "L.A." (featuring Snoop Dogg & Nate Dogg)
 N.U.N.E. - "Gangstafied Lady" (featuring Nate Dogg)
 N.U.N.E. - "Gangstafied Lady (Remix)" (featuring Nate Dogg)
 Obie Trice - "Look in My Eyes" (featuring Nate Dogg)
 Obie Trice - "All of My Life" (featuring Nate Dogg)
 Obie Trice - "The Set Up" (featuring Nate Dogg)
 Obie Trice - "The Set Up (Remix)" (featuring Nate Dogg, Redman, Jadakiss, Lloyd Banks)
 OG Daddy V - "Trouble" (featuring Nate Dogg, E-White & RBX)
 Outlawz - "Teardrops & Closed Caskets" (featuring Nate Dogg)
 Play-n-Skillz - "Do Me" (featuring Nate Dogg)
 Proof - "Sammy Da Bull" (featuring Nate Dogg, Swift)
 Psy 4 de la Rime - "A l'Ancienne" (featuring Nate Dogg)
 Rappin' 4-Tay - "If It Wasn't 4 You" (featuring Nate Dogg, Suga Free)
 Ras Kass - "4 Much" (featuring Nate Dogg, Bad Azz, Tash)
 Ray J - "Smokin Smokin" (featuring Nate Dogg, Snoop Dogg, Shorty Mack)
 Redman - "Merry Jane" (featuring Snoop Dogg  Nate Dogg)
 Redd Soul - "What U Wanna Be" (featuring Nate Dogg)
 Rock - "Walk Like a G" (featuring Nate Dogg)
 Roscoe - "Nasty Girl" (featuring Nate Dogg)
 Shade Sheist - "Cali Diseaze" (featuring Nate Dogg)
 Shade Sheist - "Everybody Wants 2b da Man" (featuring N.U.N.E, Nate Dogg, Grath, Shade Sheist)
 Shade Sheist - "Gangstafied Lady" (featuring Nate Dogg)
 Shade Sheist - "Gangstafied Lady (Remix)" (featuring Nate Dogg)
 Shade Sheist - "Hey Yo" (featuring Nate Dogg, N.U.N.E., Eddie Kane Jr.)
 Shade Sheist - "Playmate" (featuring Nate Dogg, N.U.N.E, Shade Sheist)
 Shade Sheist - "Sex Sells" (featuring Nate Dogg, Snoop Dogg, Redrum, Eddie Kane Jr., Shade Sheist, N.U.N.E.)
 Shade Sheist - "Steady Wastin" (featuring Shade Shiest, Nate Dogg, Nitty Black, Lieutenant)
 Shade Sheist - "Wake Up" (featuring Nate Dogg, Warren G)
 Shade Sheist - "Walk a Mile" (featuring Nate Dogg, Vita, Nune)
 Shade Sheist - "What Would You Do" (featuring N.U.N.E., Nate Dogg, Mariah Carey)
 Shade Sheist - "Where I Wanna Be" (featuring Nate Dogg, Kurupt)
 Shaquille O'Neal - "Connected" (featuring Nate Dogg, W.C.)
 Shyne - "Behind The Walls (Remix)" (featuring Kurupt, Nate Dogg)
 Simon Vegas - "One Night Stand" (featuring Nate Dogg)
 SNBRN - "Gangsta Walk" (featuring Nate Dogg)
 Snoop Dogg - "Ain't No Fun" (featuring Nate Dogg, Kurupt, Warren G)
 Snoop Dogg - "Bitch Please" (featuring Xzibit, Nate Dogg)
 Snoop Dogg - "Boss' Life" remix (featuring Nate Dogg)
 Snoop Dogg - "Crazy" (featuring Nate Dogg)
 Snoop Dogg - "Don't Fight The Feelin'" (featuring Nate Dogg, Cam'ron, Lady May, Soopafly)
 Snoop Dogg - "Don't Tell" (featuring Warren G, Mausberg, Nate Dogg)
 Snoop Dogg - "Eastside Party" (featuring Nate Dogg)
 Snoop Dogg - "Family Reunion" (featuring Nate Dogg, Bad Azz, Warren G, Soopafly)
 Snoop Dogg - "Gangsta Wit It" (featuring Nate Dogg, Butch Cassidy)
 Snoop Dogg - "Groupie" (featuring Tha Dogg Pound, Warren G, Nate Dogg)
 Snoop Dogg - "Lay Low" (featuring Nate Dogg, Butch Cassidy, Tha Eastsidaz, Master P)
 Snoop Dogg - "LBC'n It Up" (featuring Nate Dogg, Lil' 1/2 Dead)
 Snoop Dogg - "Lollipop" (featuring Soopafly, Nate Dogg, Jay-Z)
 Snoop Dogg - "Long Beach 2 Brick City" (featuring Redman, Nate Dogg)
 Snoop Dogg - "Rollin Down The Highway" (featuring Nate Dogg, Warren G)
 Snoop Dogg - "Santa Clause Goes Straight to the Ghetto" (featuring Bad Azz, Daz Dillinger, Nate Dogg, Tray Deee)
 Snoop Dogg - "Wannabes" (featuring Young Jeezy, Nate Dogg)
 Snoop Dogg - "Set It Off"  (featuring MC Ren, Ice Cube, Lady of Rage, Nate Dogg, Kurupt)
 Snoop Dogg - "St. Ides" (featuring Nate Dogg)
 Snoop Dogg - "The Game's Play'd Out" (featuring Nate Dogg, Prince Ital Joe)
 Snoop Dogg - "Wintertime in June" (featuring Nate Dogg & James Fauntleroy) (2019)
 Snoop Dogg - "Outside the Box" (featuring Nate Dogg) (2022)
 Soopafly - "Number 1" (featuring Snoop Dogg, Nate Dogg,  Daz Dillinger)
 Steady Mobb'n - "Let's Get It Crackin" (featuring Nate Dogg)
 Tamia - "Can't Go For That" (featuring Snoop Dogg, Nate Dogg, Warren G)
 The Game - "Special" (featuring Nate Dogg)
 The Game - "Where I'm From" (featuring Dr. Dre, Nate Dogg)
 The Game - "Too Much" (featuring Nate Dogg)
 The Notorious B.I.G. - "Runnin' Your Mouth" (featuring Fabolous, Nate Dogg, Busta Rhymes, Foxy Brown  Snoop Dogg)
 The Team - "Feel the Music" (featuring Nate Dogg)
 Tha Dogg Pound - "A Dogg'z Day Afternoon" (featuring Nate Dogg)
 Tha Dogg Pound - "Big Pimpin" (featuring Snoop Dogg, Nate Dogg)
 Tha Dogg Pound - "Cheat'n Ass Lover" (featuring Soopafly, Nate Dogg & Dru Drown)
 Tha Dogg Pound - "Don't Sweat It" (featuring Nate Dogg, RBX)
 Tha Dogg Pound - "Hard on a Hoe" (featuring Nate Dogg, RBX)
 Tha Dogg Pound - "I Don't Like to Dream About Gettin' Paid" (featuring Nate Dogg)
 Tha Dogg Pound - "Just Doggin'" (featuring Nate Dogg)
 Tha Dogg Pound - "Let's Play House" (featuring Nate Dogg)
 Tha Dogg Pound - "Real Soon" (featuring Snoop Dogg, Nate Dogg)
 Tha Eastsidaz - "Cool" (featuring Butch Cassidy, Nate Dogg)
 Tha Eastsidaz - "Eastside Ridaz" (featuring Nate Dogg)
 Tha Eastsidaz - "Ghetto" (featuring Kokane, Kam, Nate Dogg)
 Tha Eastsidaz - "Let's Go" (featuring Nate Dogg)
 Tha Eastsidaz - "Welcome to the House" (featuring Nate Dogg)
 The Click - "Rock Ya Body" (featuring Snoop Dogg, Nate Dogg, Tha Dogg Pound)
 Thug Life - "How Long Will They Mourn Me" (featuring Nate Dogg)
 Various Artist (Music for relief Charity) - "Forever in Our Hearts"
 Warren G - "Annie Mae" (featuring Nate Dogg)
 Warren G - "100 Miles & Runnin" (featuring Nate Dogg  Raekwon) 2009
 Warren G - "Clownin" (featuring Nate Dogg) 2007
 Warren G - "Gangsta Love" (featuring Kurupt, Nate Dogg, RBX)
 Warren G - "Havin Thangs" (featuring Jermaine Dupri, Nate Dogg)
 Warren G - "Here Comes Another Hit" (featuring Nate Dogg, Mistah Grimm)
 Warren G - "I Need a Light" (featuring Nate Dogg)
 Warren G - "Mid-Nite Hour" (featuring Nate Dogg)
 Warren G - "PYT" (featuring Snoop Dogg, Nate Dogg)
 Warren G - "Regulate" (featuring Nate Dogg)
 Warren G - "The Game Don't Wait" (featuring Snoop Dogg, Nate Dogg)
 Warren G - "The Game Don't Wait (Remix)" (featuring Snoop Dogg, Nate Dogg, Xzibit)
 Warren G - "What U Wanna Do" (featuring Nate Dogg)
 Warren G - "Yo Sassy Ways" (featuring Nate Dogg, Snoop Dogg)
 WC - "Paper Trippin'" (featuring Nate Dogg)
 WC - "The Streets" (featuring Nate Dogg)
 WC - "The Streets (Remix)" (featuring Nate Dogg, Snoop Dogg)
 Westside Connection - "Gangsta Nation" (featuring Nate Dogg)
 Westside Connection - "Gangsta Nation (Fredwreck Remix)" (featuring Nate Dogg)
 Xzibit - "Been a Long Time" (featuring Nate Dogg)
 Xzibit - "Multiply" (featuring Nate Dogg)
 Xzibit - "My Name" (featuring Eminem, Nate Dogg)
 Yukmouth - "So Ignorant" (featuring Nate Dogg, Kokane, Kurupt)

References

External links
 Nate Dogg at AllMusic
 
 

Hip hop discographies
Discographies of American artists